Franklin County Airport  is a public airport located one mile (2 km) southwest of the central business district of Canon, a city in Franklin County, Georgia, United States. It is owned by Franklin County.

Facilities and aircraft 
For the 12-month period ending August 9, 2006, the airport had 6,000 aircraft operations, 100% of which were general aviation.

References

External links 

Airports in Georgia (U.S. state)
Buildings and structures in Franklin County, Georgia
Transportation in Franklin County, Georgia